Mark William McNulty (born 24 March 1953) is a Zimbabwean-Irish professional golfer. He was one of the leading players on the European Tour from the mid-1980s to the mid-1990s, and featured in the top 10 of the Official World Golf Ranking for 83 weeks from 1987 to 1992.

Early life

McNulty was born in Bindura, Southern Rhodesia (now known as Zimbabwe). He was raised on a farm in the Centenary area of Zimbabwe. When McNulty was one year old, his natural father was killed in a shooting accident. His step-father was an amateur pilot who had an airstrip on the farm. When his step-father was diagnosed with epilepsy, he was forced to give up flying. He converted the airstrip into a three-hole golf course, where Mark first learned to play golf.

Amateur career
McNulty represented Rhodesia at the 1974 Eisenhower Trophy in the Dominican Republic on the same team as future PGA Tour winner Denis Watson.

Professional career

After a successful amateur career, McNulty began his professional career on the Southern African Tour (now the Sunshine Tour) and also played on the European Tour starting in 1978. His first professional win was the 1979 Holiday Inns Royal Swazi Sun Open in South Africa. By 1986 he was a dominant player on the Southern African Tour, picking up seven official wins in that year and also winning South Africa's most lucrative event, the Million Dollar Challenge. In the same year, he finished in the top-10 on the European Tour's Order of Merit for the first time, placing sixth. He had six top-10 European Order of Merit finishes in total, including second places in 1987 and 1990. The last of these was in 1996, when he came fifth. His win tally on the European Tour was 16, including the 1996 Volvo Masters, which was the European equivalent of the PGA Tour's Tour Championship. He won the Sunshine Tour Order of Merit nine times.

In July 1990, at the 119th Open Championship at the Old Course in St Andrews, Scotland, with a closing round of 65, the lowest score of the last round, McNulty finished tied second with Payne Stewart, after winner Nick Faldo.

McNulty represented Zimbabwe seven times at the Alfred Dunhill Cup and eight times at the World Cup. The Zimbabwe team twice finished runner-up to United States, 1993, when McNulty teamed up with Nick Price at the Lake Nona Golf & Country Club in Orlando, Florida, and at the 1994 World Cup of Golf in Puerto Rico, where the team of McNulty and Tony Johnstone finished second and McNulty finished tied 4th in the individual competition.

When McNulty turned fifty and became eligible to play senior golf he chose to take part in the U.S.-based Champions Tour. His first full season in 2004 was highly successful with three wins (including the Charles Schwab Cup Championship) and a seventh-place finish on the money list. In 2007 he won the JELD-WEN Tradition, one of the five major championships on the over-50 tour. It was McNulty's sixth career win on the Champions Tour. His seventh win came in 2009 at the Principal Charity Classic with a playoff win over Nick Price and Fred Funk.

Private life
During 1978−1980, McNulty represented South Africa in professional tournaments.

In November 1981, he received serious facial and neck injuries when his car in high speed collided with a bus near his parents' farm in Zimbabwe, on is way to the ICL Tournament in Johannesburg, South Africa. Despite his injuries, McNulty played in the 1981 South African Open the following month and won a tournament in Durban in January 1982, eight weeks after the accident.

McNulty became an Irish citizen in 2003 at the age of 50. He was eligible to do so because his maternal grandmother was born in Ballymena in Northern Ireland. He stated that his reason for doing so was his concern that as a non-resident Zimbabwean it could take him up to two years to get his passport renewed if he lost it. Commentators elaborated that the farm that his family had been managing for 40-something years had been confiscated by the Mugabe regime. He lives in Sunningdale, England with his wife Allison and they have two children together, Matthew (born 1985) and Catherine (born 1988). McNulty also has two stepchildren and two grandchildren.

McNulty lists his interests as piano, fine arts, scuba activities, underwater photography, and shark diving.

McNulty is the Director of the Mark McNulty Junior Golf Foundation, a non-profit organisation whose objective is to use golf as a medium to improve a child's development on and off the golf course, while growing the game of golf.

Amateur wins
1974 Rhodesia Amateur Championship
1977 South African Amateur Stroke Play Championship

Professional wins (59)

European Tour wins (16)

1Co-sanctioned by the Sunshine Tour

European Tour playoff record (2–2)

Sunshine Tour wins (33)
1979 (1) Holiday Inns Royal Swazi Sun Open
1981 (1) SAB South African Masters
1982 (4) SISA Classic, SAB Masters, Sharp Electronics Classic, Sun City Classic
1984 (1) Pan Am Wild Coast Sun Classic
1985 (3) Palabora Classic, Hollard Royal Swazi Sun Open, Safmarine Masters
1986 (7) Safmarine Masters, Wild Coast Classic, Barclays Bank Classic, Swazi Sun Pro Am, Trustbank Tournament of Champions, Helix Wild Coast Classic, Germiston Centenary Tournament
1987 (4) Southern Suns South African Open, AECI Charity Classic, Royal Swazi Sun Pro-Am, Trustbank Tournament of Champions
1993 (2) Lexington PGA Championship, FNB Players Championship
1996 (2) Dimension Data Pro-Am1, Zimbabwe Open
1997 (2) San Lameer SA Masters, Nashua Wild Coast Sun Challenge
1998 (1) Vodacom Players Championship
2000 (1) Stenham Swazi Open
2000–01 (3) CABS Old Mutual Zimbabwe Open, Nashua Nedtel Cellular Masters, Mercedes-Benz South African Open1
2002–03 (1) Vodacom Players Championship
1Co-sanctioned by the European Tour

Challenge Tour wins (1)

Asia Golf Circuit wins (1)

Other wins (2)

Champions Tour wins (8)

Champions Tour playoff record (3–1)

Results in major championships

CUT = missed the half-way cut
WD = withdrew
"T" indicates a tie for a place.

Summary

Most consecutive cuts made – 9 (1989 Open Championship – 1993 Open Championship)
Longest streak of top-10s – 2 (1990 Open Championship – 1990 PGA)

Results in The Players Championship

CUT = missed the halfway cut
"T" indicates a tie for a place

Results in World Golf Championships

1Cancelled due to 9/11

QF, R16, R32, R64 = Round in which player lost in match play
NT = No tournament

Senior major championships

Wins (1)

Senior results timeline
Results not in chronological order before 2017.

CUT = missed the halfway cut
"T" indicates a tie for a place

Team appearances
Amateur
Eisenhower Trophy (representing Rhodesia): 1974

Professional
Alfred Dunhill Cup (representing Zimbabwe): 1993, 1994, 1995, 1996, 1997, 1998, 1999, 2000
World Cup (representing Zimbabwe): 1993, 1994, 1995, 1996, 1997, 1998, 1999, 2000, 2001
Presidents Cup (International team): 1994, 1996
Alfred Dunhill Challenge (representing Southern Africa): 1995 (winners)
UBS Cup (representing the Rest of the World): 2004

See also
List of golfers with most European Tour wins

References

External links

Zimbabwean male golfers
Irish male golfers
Sunshine Tour golfers
European Tour golfers
PGA Tour golfers
PGA Tour Champions golfers
Winners of senior major golf championships
White Zimbabwean sportspeople
Zimbabwean expatriates in England
Zimbabwean people of Ulster-Scottish descent
Zimbabwean people of British descent
Citizens of Ireland through descent
Irish expatriate sportspeople in England
Alumni of Prince Edward School
Sportspeople from Bindura
1953 births
Living people